Saphan Taksin station is a BTS skytrain station, on the Silom Line in Sathon and Bang Rak Districts, Bangkok, Thailand. The station is located at the entry ramp of Taksin Bridge, below Sathon Road, to the east of the Chao Phraya River. It is the only rapid transit station in Bangkok which can transfer to a river pier for the crossing-river ferry to Thonburi and the Chao Phraya Express Boat service. That makes the station popular for both daily passengers and tourists sightseeing by river boats to historical area such as Wat Arun, Wat Pho and Sanam Luang.

It has been proposed since 2012 to close and demolish the station to facilitate the construction of a second track, which will "ease the bottleneck over its stretch across the Chao Phraya River" however as of December 2015, there has been no decision on how to proceed. 

In August 2017, the Bangkok Metropolitan Administration formally announced the plans, by extending the road bridges of the Taksin Bridge and rebuild the station when the road bridges are done. The rebuilding will cost one billion baht and is due to be completed in 40 months, before December 2019. However, the project was delayed, and as of July 2020 BTSC was still in search for a suitable contractor, expected to have the contract signed in August with works commencing a month later.

Facilities
  Tourist information office
 Chao Phraya Express Boat service at Sathorn Pier
 Cross-river ferry to Charoen Nakhon Road

See also
 BTS Skytrain
 Taksin Bridge

References

BTS Skytrain stations
Railway stations opened in 1999
1999 establishments in Thailand
Buildings and structures on the Chao Phraya River